The Galactic Federation is a supposed alliance of extraterrestrial civilizations within the Milky Way. This interdimensional council was allegedly revealed through channeling to Sheldan Nidle, founder of the Ground Crew Project, among others. The idea that such a federation would exist is popular within UFO religions and certain New Age movements. This federation also appears in many science fiction stories.

Description 
According to the scriptures of the Church of Scientology, a galactic war took place 75 million years ago between the 26 stars that would now form the Galactic Federation. As a result of this war, the Galactic Federation would have been created.

The federation's goal would be to prevent wars like this one in the future and resolve galactic conflicts peacefully. The Galactic Federation would consist of hundreds of thousands of members, including the Arcturians, Pleiadians, Sirians, Lyrans and Andromedans. The federation would be governed by a large council made up of smaller councils, and the hierarchy among members would be determined by their spiritual development. The highest developed members would be light beings interpreting the will of God.

Israel's Former Space Security Chief 
In 2020, former head of Israel's military space program Haim Eshed has claimed that aliens have made contact with representatives of the United States and Israel over the years. During an interview with the Hebrew-language newspaper Yediot Aharonot, the professor and retired Israeli general said that humanity is not yet ready for contact with extraterrestrials. Eshed told the newspaper that aliens are already among us on Earth, and that different species have formed a "Galactic Federation," akin to those in Star Trek, according to translations from the Jerusalem Post. This "Galactic Federation" would keep itself secret to avoid hysteria until humanity would be ready.

NASA released a statement after these claims went viral, writing that no extraterrestrial life has yet been found and that the search for extraterrestrial life is ongoing.

See also 
 Ancient astronauts
 Xenu

References 

Extraterrestrial life
Ufology
New Age
Science fiction